APA most often refers to:
 American Psychological Association
 APA style, a writing style guide from the American Psychological Association
 Acolytes Protection Agency, a professional wrestling tag-team

APA or Apa may also refer to:

Entertainment and media
 Agency for the Performing Arts, a talent and literary agency
 Father (1966 film)

Government and politics 
 Administrative Procedure Act (United States), a statute controlling government agency actions
 Advance pricing agreement
 Approved Publication Arrangement

Language
 Americanist phonetic notation or the American phonetic alphabet
 Southern Athabaskan languages excluding Navajo (ISO 639 code: apa)

Organizations and businesses

Australia
 APA Group (Australia), electricity generation and gas pipeline company
 Aborigines Progressive Association
 Australian Parkour Association
 Australian Progressive Alliance

Japan
 Japan Advertising Photographers' Association
 APA Group (Japan), a Japanese hotel chain

United Kingdom
 All Peoples' Association (1930–1936), a British organisation for international amity
 Army Prosecuting Authority, former government body
 Association of Publishing Agencies

United States 
 APA – The Engineered Wood Association, formerly the American Plywood Association
 APA Corporation, an energy company
 A-P-A Transport Corp., New Jersey 
 Adirondack Park Agency, New York
 Agency for the Performing Arts, a talent and literary agency
 Allied Pilots Association, a labor union for American Airlines pilots
 American Payroll Association
 American Philological Association, devoted to Greek and Roman civilization
 American Philosophical Association
 American Planning Association, representing the field of city and regional planning
 American Polygraph Association
 American Poolplayers Association
 American Poultry Association
 American Protective Association, a former anti-Catholic organization
 American Psychiatric Association
 Anglican Province of America, a church
 Austin Peace Academy, an Islamic school in Texas

Elsewhere 
 Association of Panamerican Athletics
 Austria Press Agency
 
 NSDAP Office of Foreign Affairs (Außenpolitisches Amt der NSDAP), a Nazi Party organization

People
 Apa (footballer) (born 2000), Spanish footballer
 Apa of Slavonia, 12th-century Hungarian noble
 Apa Sherpa, a Nepali Sherpa and famous Mt. Everest mountaineer
 KJ Apa (born 1997), New Zealand actor

Places

Asia
 Apa, Acıpayam
 Upu, a historic region surrounding Damascus (alternative transliteration)
 The Hong Kong Academy for Performing Arts

North America
 Apache Railway, Arizona, U.S. (by reporting mark)
 Anderson Preparatory Academy, a school in Indiana, United States
 Centennial Airport, Colorado, United States (by IATA code)

Other places
 Antarctic Protected Area, several types of zone on Antarctica
 Apa, Nigeria, a local government area in Benue
 Apa, Satu Mare, a commune in Romania

Maritime
 Apa (ship) , an Amazonas-class corvette of the Brazilian Navy
 Advance provisioning allowance
 Auxiliary Personnel, Attack, a US Navy troopship designation

Science and technology 
 Aldosterone-producing adenoma
 All points addressable
 Amplified piezoelectric actuator
 Atypical polypoid adenomyoma
 Apa, a type of Bronze Age sword named after the Romanian village

Other uses 
 Apa, Coptic form of Ab (Semitic)
 Amateur press association, any group of people who self-publish material among themselves
 American pale ale
 Antarctic Protected Area, several types of place on Antarctica
 Asian Pacific American
 Asset purchase agreement
 Australian Postgraduate Awards